Mansbach is a village and a municipal district of Hohenroda in Hersfeld-Rotenburg district in eastern Hesse, Germany.

Villages in Hesse